Jayson Megna (born February 1, 1990) is an American professional ice hockey forward currently playing for the  Anaheim Ducks of the National Hockey League (NHL). Megna was born in Fort Lauderdale, Florida, but grew up in Northbrook, Illinois where he started to play hockey at the age of 7.

Playing career
As a youth, Megna played in the 2003 Quebec International Pee-Wee Hockey Tournament with the Chicago Young Americans minor ice hockey team.

He played high school hockey at Glenbrook North High School and Tabor Academy.  He graduated in 2009 and then went to the USHL where he played two seasons with the Cedar Rapids Roughriders.  After two seasons with Cedar Rapids, Jayson went to University of Nebraska at Omaha where he played on the same team as his brother Jaycob Megna.  While there, Jayson was named to the WCHA All-Rookie Team.

Following his freshman year Jayson attended the Pittsburgh Penguins development camp and on August 1, 2012 he signed a two-way contract with an annual value of $925,000.  In the 2013–14 season, on October 24, 2013, Jayson was recalled from the Wilkes-Barre/Scranton Penguins (AHL).  He made his NHL debut versus the New York Islanders on October 25, 2013.  He scored his first NHL point, an assist, and also his first NHL goal against the Carolina Hurricanes on October 28, 2013.

On July 1, 2015, Megna left the Penguins organization as a free agent and signed a one-year, two-way contract with the New York Rangers.  He began the 2015–16 season with the Rangers' AHL affiliate the Hartford Wolfpack, and was promoted to the Rangers on November 30, 2015.  Megna returned to the Wolfpack on January 22, 2016 for a brief stint. He was later recalled by the Rangers on April 20, 2016, from the team's AHL affiliate, the Hartford Wolf Pack.

With his contract with the Rangers completed, Megna secured a one-year, one-way deal as a free agent with the Vancouver Canucks on July 1, 2016.  He was reassigned to the Canucks' AHL affiliate, the Utica Comets to start the season but was recalled to the Canucks on October 24, 2016.  On December 8, 2016 he scored two goals to help the Canucks defeat the Tampa Bay Lightning by a score of 5–1 for his first career multi-goal game.

On April 2, 2017, Megna signed a one-year extension with the Canucks for the  season.

On July 1, 2018, Megna signed as a free agent to a one-year, two-way contract with the Washington Capitals for the  season. Playing with the Capitals AHL affiliate, the Hershey Bears, Megna was used in a top six forward role to produce 20 goals and 43 points in 71 games during the regular season and added 8 points in 9 postseason outings.

As a free agent from the Capitals, Megna agreed to one-year, two-way $700,000 contract with his fifth NHL club, the Colorado Avalanche on July 1, 2019. After attending his first Avalanche training camp, Megna was amongst the last cuts re-assigned to begin the  season with AHL affiliate, the Colorado Eagles. Collecting 4 points through his first 8 games, Megna was recalled to the NHL and made his Avalanche debut in a 4-3 overtime defeat against the Florida Panthers on October 30, 2019. Megna made 8 appearances throughout the season going scoreless, returning to the AHL he notched 18 goals and 34 points in 43 regular season games before the season was halted due to the COVID-19 pandemic.

On October 11, 2020, Megna was re-signed to a one-year, two-way extension with the Avalanche. In the pandemic delayed  season, Megna appeared with both the Eagles and Avalanche, primarily assigned as a part of the Avalanche's taxi squad. He recorded his first points with the Avalanche, notching two assists in two consecutive games against the Los Angeles Kings on May 12, 13. He remained on the Avalanche's extended roster throughout the post-season, despite not featuring.

Megna continued his tenure with the Avalanche on June 16, 2021, agreeing to a two-year, two-way contract extension.

In the final year of his contract, Megna was re-assigned to the AHL to resume his role as captain of the Eagles to open the  season. After two games with the Eagles, he was recalled by the injury depleted Avalanche to assume fourth-line center duties. Megna went scoreless through 14 games with the Avalanche before he was placed on waivers and claimed the following day by the Anaheim Ducks on December 6, 2022.

Personal life
His younger brother Jaycob (born December 10, 1992) is also a professional hockey player, contracted by the Seattle Kraken. His father, Jay, was a defensive back for the Miami Dolphins and the New Orleans Saints in the 1980s.

He is married to Taylor Craig, daughter of 1980 U.S. Olympic goaltender, Jim Craig; the couple welcomed their first daughter in 2021.

Career statistics

Awards and honors

References

External links

1990 births
American men's ice hockey centers
Anaheim Ducks players
Cedar Rapids RoughRiders players
Colorado Avalanche players
Colorado Eagles players
Glenbrook North High School alumni
Hartford Wolf Pack players
Hershey Bears players
Ice hockey people from Florida
Living people
New York Rangers players
Omaha Mavericks men's ice hockey players
People from Northbrook, Illinois
Pittsburgh Penguins players
Sportspeople from Fort Lauderdale, Florida
Tabor Academy (Massachusetts) alumni
Undrafted National Hockey League players
Utica Comets players
Vancouver Canucks players
Wilkes-Barre/Scranton Penguins players